Taynuilt railway station is a railway station serving the village of Taynuilt in western Scotland. This station is on the Oban branch of the West Highland Line, originally part of the Callander and Oban Railway, between Falls of Cruachan and Connel Ferry, sited  from Callander via Glen Ogle. ScotRail manage the station and operate all services.

History 

Taynuilt station opened on 30 June 1880, when the Callander and Oban Railway was extended from Dalmally to Oban.

The station is laid out with two platforms, one on either side of a crossing loop. There are two sidings on the south side of the station.

On 11 January 1987, the crossing loop was altered to right-hand running. The original Down platform has thus become the Up platform, and vice versa. The change was made in order to simplify shunting at this station, by removing the need to hand-pump the train-operated loop points to access the sidings.

Facilities 
Facilities at the station are basic, consisting of shelters on both platforms, a bench on platform 2, bike racks and ca car park adjacent to platform 1 and a help point on the wall of the old signal box. All of the station has step-free access. As there are no facilities to purchase tickets, passengers must buy one in advance, or from the guard on the train.

Passenger volume 
The increase in station usage recorded in the 2020/21 Office of Rail and Road statistics, at a time when passenger numbers across the UK fell drastically in the Covid-19 pandemic, was attributed to the introduction of school services on the Oban line.

The statistics cover twelve month periods that start in April.

Services

On Sundays, there are 3 departures each way throughout the year, but there is a fourth in the summer from late June–August which runs from Edinburgh Waverley to Oban and back.

References

Bibliography

External links 

 Video footage of the station on YouTube

Railway stations in Argyll and Bute
Former Caledonian Railway stations
Railway stations in Great Britain opened in 1880
Railway stations served by ScotRail